Dorota Elżbieta Simonides (born 1928 Janów) - Polish folklorist and politician. Professor emerita of the Faculty of Philology, Opole University. She lost her library (5 000 volumes) during the 1997 Central European flood.

References

External links

The Polish Science Database

1928 births
Polish folklorists
Academic staff of the University of Wrocław
Living people
Herder Prize recipients
Women folklorists